North Corfu ( Voreia Kerkyra) is a municipality on the island of Corfu in the Ionian Islands region in Greece. The municipality was formed at the 2019 local government reform, when the pre-existing municipality of Corfu was divided in three. Its seat is the village Acharavi.

The municipality consists of the following four subdivisions (municipal units):
Agios Georgios
Esperies
Kassopaia
Thinali

References 

Populated places in Corfu (regional unit)
2019 establishments in Greece
Municipalities of the Ionian Islands (region)